Xing Lin (born May 25, 1979 in Liaoning) is a female Chinese triathlete. Xing competed at the second Olympic triathlon at the 2004 Summer Olympics. She did not finish the race. She will compete at the 2008 Summer Olympics.

References
 Profile

1979 births
Living people
Olympic triathletes of China
Sportspeople from Liaoning
Triathletes at the 2004 Summer Olympics
Triathletes at the 2008 Summer Olympics
Chinese female triathletes
Triathletes at the 2006 Asian Games
Asian Games competitors for China
20th-century Chinese women
21st-century Chinese women